Empis volucris  is a species of fly in the family Empididae. It is included in the subgenus Coptophlebia of the genus Empis. It is found in the  Palearctic .

References

Empis
Insects described in 1822
Asilomorph flies of Europe